R3, R.III or R-3 or R/3 may refer to:

Aviation
 Aviatik R.III, a German aircraft
 DFW R.III, a World War I German bomber aircraft
 Ross R-3 glider
 Tupolev R-3 Soviet reconnaissance aircraft
 Yakutia Airlines IATA airline designator

Entertainment
 BBC Radio 3, a radio operated by the BBC within the United Kingdom
 R3 (TV series), produced by the BBC between 1964 and 1965
 Region 3, the DVD region code for Southeast Asia, South Korea, Republic of China (Taiwan), Hong Kong, Macau
 Resistance 3, the third game in the Resistance series
 R3 (video game), a computer game for the Amiga series of computers in 1995

Military
 Version of the German Rheintochter ground to air missile
 R-3 (missile), the Vympel K-13, an air-to-air missile also known as R-3S in Soviet service
 R-3 (tank), a proposed Romanian tank design for use in World War II
 USS R-3 (SS-80), a 1919 R-class coastal and harbor defense submarine of the United States Navy

Math and Science
 R3: Extreme risk of explosion by shock, friction, fire or other sources of ignition, a risk phrase in chemistry
 R-3 process, a chromogenic photo process for making Type R prints
 R3 or receptor 3, the third in line of a series of cellular receptors, generally at the end of an acronym
 R3, three-dimensional space, the Euclidean space of real numbers in three dimensions

Transportation 
 R3 expressway (Czech Republic), a road connecting Kaplice and the border with Austria
 R3 expressway (Slovakia), a road connecting  Krupina and Zvolen
 Radial Road 3 or R-3, an arterial road of Manila, Philippines
 R-3 motorway (Spain), a road connecting Madrid and Tarancón
 R3 (SEPTA), a former commuter rail line in and near Philadelphia, Pennsylvania, which has been split into:
 Media/Wawa Line  (R3 Media/Elwyn, formerly R3 West Chester), 
 West Trenton Line (SEPTA) (R3 West Trenton)
 R3 (ring road) in Belgium
 R3 (Rodalies de Catalunya), a commuter rail line in Barcelona, Catalonia, Spain
 R3 Lougheed Highway, an express bus route in Metro Vancouver, British Columbia, Canada

Other uses 
 Ågestaverket, also known as R3, was the third nuclear reactor built in Sweden
 Jaguar R3, a car made by Jaguar Racing for the 2002 Formula One season
 Leica R3, a 1976 35mm SLR camera
 Reduce, reuse, recycle
 SAP R/3, the previous designation for an enterprise resource planning software produced by SAP AG; the new name is SAP ERP
 Yamaha R3
 ISO Recommendation R3, a forerunner to the international standard ISO 3
 Canon EOS R3, a Canon full-frame mirrorless interchangeable-lens camera

See also 
 R03 (disambiguation)
 3R (disambiguation)